Furo is an extinct genus of ray-finned fish belonging to the order Ioniscopiformes that has been found in Europe. The type species is F. orthostomus.

Taxonomy
The type species of Furo, F. orthostomus, was originally named Eugnathus by the Swiss naturalist Louis Agassiz in 1843, but the genus name was changed to Furo by Gistel in 1848 because Eugnathus was preoccupied by the spider genus Eugnatha. A number of species referred to Furo have been found in the Solnhofen Formation of Bavaria. The type species of Ophiopsis, O. muensteri, was mistakenly referred to Furo by some authors, but recent studies have indicated that the Furo and Ophiopsis type species are distantly related.

References 

Ionoscopiformes
Prehistoric ray-finned fish genera
Jurassic fish of Europe
Mesozoic fish of Europe
Fossil taxa described in 1848